Tom Gunnar Söderberg (born 25 August 1987) is a Swedish former professional footballer who played as a center back. Beginning his career with BK Häcken in 2006, he went on to represent IF Elfsborg, Apollon Smyrni, and Sogndal before retiring at Dalkurd FF in 2016. He won one cap for the Sweden national team in 2010.

Club career 
After spending his youth years in Norwegian side Viking FK, he transferred to Häcken in his home country in 2006. He stayed there for six seasons, playing a total of 108 games in all competitions and scoring 10 goals. As a Bosman player before the 2013 season, he signed a three-year-contract for IF Elfsborg.

Although he played 18 games and scored 3 goals for Elfsborg, he was loaned out to Greek side Apollon Smyrni. After six months in the Greek club, the loan deal ended, and a new loan deal to Norwegian side Sogndal was signed. The club has secured an option to buy the player after the 2014 season.
On March 25, 2015 he returned to BK Häcken.

International career 
On 20 January 2010, Söderberg made his full international debut for the Sweden national team in a friendly game against Oman. He played the entire 90 minutes as a centre back alongside Per Karlsson in a game that ended 1–0 in Sweden's favor after a 35th-minute goal from Anders Svensson. This turned out to be Söderberg's sole international appearance for Sweden.

Personal life 
He is the older brother of fellow professional footballer Ole Söderberg.

References

External links

1987 births
Living people
Swedish footballers
Sweden international footballers
Swedish expatriate footballers
Allsvenskan players
Super League Greece players
Hisingsbacka FC players
BK Häcken players
Dalkurd FF players
IF Elfsborg players
Apollon Smyrnis F.C. players
Expatriate footballers in Greece
Sportspeople from Norrköping
Association football defenders
Footballers from Östergötland County